NGC 352 is a barred spiral galaxy in the constellation Cetus. It was discovered on September 20, 1784 by William Herschel. It was described as "pretty faint, small, irregularly extended" by John Louis Emil Dreyer, the compiler of the New General Catalogue; he also noted an "8th magnitude star 97 seconds of time to east" relative to the galaxy.

References

Notes

External links
 

Barred spiral galaxies
17840920
Cetus (constellation)
0352
003701
Discoveries by William Herschel